The Peter L. Cherry House is a house located in Astoria, Oregon, listed on the National Register of Historic Places.

See also
 National Register of Historic Places listings in Clatsop County, Oregon

References

1877 establishments in Oregon
Houses completed in 1877
Houses on the National Register of Historic Places in Astoria, Oregon
Individually listed contributing properties to historic districts on the National Register in Oregon
Italianate architecture in Oregon